State Highway 149 (abbreviated SH-149) is a state highway in Oklahoma.

Route description
SH-149 begins at US-283 in Laverne. From this junction, the highway follows Main Street to the east out of town. About two and a half miles east of Laverne, the road crosses the Beaver River. SH-149 then continues due east to SH-46, where it ends.

History

Junction list

References

External links

 SH-149 at OKHighways.com

149
Transportation in Harper County, Oklahoma